Ravenswood is a care village run by Norwood, a Jewish charity supporting children and families with educational needs, in the English county of Berkshire, part of the civil parish of Wokingham Without, adjoining Crowthorne.

The settlement was established in 1953 as a self-contained environment for disabled children.

It stands on the site of Bigshotte Lodge, the home of the Keeper of Bigshotte Rayles, an ancient division of Windsor Forest. It used to be called Hannican's Lodge, after a man called Hankin or Hanykin who was under-keeper in 1607.

References

External links
 Norwood Ravenswood website

Hamlets in Berkshire
Wokingham
Borough of Wokingham